André Mathieu, musicien is a Canadian documentary film, directed by Jean-Claude Labrecque and released in 1993. The film is a portrait of Canadian classical pianist and composer André Mathieu.

The film premiered in Montreal in November 1993. It was screened in February 1994 as the opening film of the inaugural Hot Docs Canadian International Documentary Festival.

The film was a Genie Award nominee for Best Feature Length Documentary at the 15th Genie Awards in 1994.

References

External links 
 

1993 films
1993 documentary films
Canadian documentary films
Documentary films about classical music and musicians
Films directed by Jean-Claude Labrecque
National Film Board of Canada documentaries
1990s Canadian films